Under United Kingdom patent law, a patent may only be granted for "an invention". While the meaning of invention is not defined, certain things are not regarded as inventions. Such things are excluded from patentability. This article lists judgments delivered by the UK courts that deal with excluded subject matter.

The provisions about what are not to be regarded as inventions are not easy. There has been and continues to be much debate about them and about decisions on them given by national courts and the Boards of Appeal of the European Patent Office. This article also list some of the discussions that have been had about the different judgments.

Law
Article 52 of the European Patent Convention, which represents the source of UK law in this area and which should have the same meaning states that:
(1) European patents shall be granted for any inventions, in all fields of technology, provided that they are new, involve an inventive step and are susceptible of industrial application.
(2) The following in particular shall not be regarded as inventions within the meaning of paragraph 1:
(a) discoveries, scientific theories and mathematical methods;
(b) aesthetic creations;
(c) schemes, rules and methods for performing mental acts, playing games or doing business, and programs for computers;
(d) presentations of information.
(3) Paragraph 2 shall exclude the patentability of the subject-matter or activities referred to therein only to the extent to which a European patent application or European patent relates to such subject-matter or activities as such.

By year
The following table lists judgments by year, although it is sortable by any of the other fields by activating the sort icon.

1993
 Lux Traffic Controls v Pike Signals [1993] RPC 107 (per Aldous J)

1996

2005

2006

 - upheld on appeal
 - overruled on appeal

2007

2008

2009

2011

2013

By subject matter
The following table lists judgments and the different categories of excluded subject matter that are discussed within that judgment. 
 Categories in blue were not discussed in the judgment. 
 Categories in yellow were discussed but not judged on. 
 Categories in green were judged on but the (alleged) invention was found not to fall into that category. 
 Categories in red were judged on and the (alleged) invention was found to fall into that category; hence the claimed invention was excluded.

Discussions
Lawyers, patent attorneys and economists have often debated the effects of the judgments listed above. A list of some papers and articles is provided below. Many of these papers discuss more than one judgment, but they have been ordered according to their primary focus, if there is one.

Fujitsu's Application
Software Patents After Fujitsu. New Directions or (another) Missed Opportunity?, Ian Lloyd, University of Strathclyde. Alternative link
IP/IT Update Patents Case Note: Fujitsu Ltd's Application

CFPH's Applications
 A Step Forward? Excluding "Technical" From the Test for Patentable Subject Matter
 Consensus Forms? High Court Approach to the Patentability of Computer Programs and Business Methods

Aerotel v Telco and Macrossan's Application
 COURT OF APPEAL ISSUES EAGERLY-AWAITED AEROTEL/MACROSSAN DECISION CONCERNING THE PATENTABILITY OF COMPUTER PROGRAM AND BUSINESS METHOD INVENTIONS
 Thought policing, Alan Johnson, David Brown and James Boon, Bristows

Multi-judgment discussions
 Inherent Patentability as related to computer software 
 Is the extension of the patent system to include software related inventions desirable? 
Intellectual Property - Special Interest Group: The edge of reason - boundaries to what can be patented

Key
RPC = Reports of Patent, Design and Trade Mark Cases
Patents / Pat = Patents Court
EWHC = England and Wales High Court
Ch = Chancery Division
EWCA / CA = Court of Appeal
Civ = Civil Division

See also 
List of decisions of the EPO Boards of Appeal relating to Article 52(2) and (3) EPC
Software patents under United Kingdom patent law

References

Software patent case law
Judgments relating to excluded subject matter
Judgments relating to excluded subject matter